Microsoft Store was a chain of retail stores and is an online shopping site, owned and operated by Microsoft and dealing in computers, computer software, and consumer electronics.

The Microsoft Store offered Signature PCs and tablets like the Microsoft Surface, and offerings from third parties such as Acer, Dell, HP, Lenovo, and VAIO without demos nor trialware (pre-installed free trials of certain third-party software that expire after a limited time). It also offered Windows (most retail versions), Microsoft Office, and Xbox One game consoles, games, and services including on-site Xbox diagnostics. The Answers Desk helped to answer questions related to Office, Windows, and other Microsoft products; the stores also offer class sessions as well as individual appointments.

The first two Microsoft Stores opened within a week of the Windows 7 launch, in Scottsdale, Arizona, and Mission Viejo, California. Additional stores opened in California, Colorado, Florida, Georgia, Illinois, Minnesota, Missouri, Texas, Virginia, and Washington. At the 2011 Professional Developers Conference, Microsoft announced that they intended to open 75 new stores in the next three years.

The first store outside the U.S. (and the first of eight stores in Canada) opened in Toronto on November 16, 2012, while the first store outside North America (and first store in Asia-Pacific and second flagship store) opened in Sydney, Australia, on November 12, 2015. In September 2017, the company announced a store on Regent Street in London, England.

On June 26, 2020, Microsoft announced that it would close all of its physical stores once COVID-19 pandemic restrictions are lifted, and transition to a digital-only model. Four stores in New York City, Sydney, London, and Redmond would be renovated into "experience centers".

History
Microsoft's first retail store was located in the Metreon in San Francisco. It was owned and operated by Sony Retail Entertainment and ran from 1999 to 2001.

In 2009, Microsoft built a "Retail Experience Center" in their Redmond, Washington headquarters and announced plans to build its own retail stores. On October 22, 2009, the same day as the Windows 7 launch, Microsoft opened a retail store in Scottsdale, Arizona.  A week later, another opened in Mission Viejo, California. Five additional stores were opened in 2010. A ninth store opened in Atlanta in May 2011, with two more openings planned in Houston and Los Angeles by the end of June.

The majority of Microsoft Stores were closed in March 2020 due to the COVID-19 pandemic. On June 26, 2020, Microsoft announced that it would permanently close all of its physical retail stores in favor of a digital marketplace. Four stores would be renovated into "experience centers": New York City, Sydney, London, and Redmond.

Shopping experience
The Microsoft Store was similar to the popular Apple Store concept, which has been largely successful.
The concept aims to give a greater level of customer satisfaction both by only having sales staff as well as by employing "Technical Advisers" (similar to Apple's "Geniuses") to assist customers with technical questions and issues. In addition, "Specialists" (or trainers) were employed to show customers how to get the most out of their software. Xbox One consoles were also available to entertain patrons.

Retail locations

There were Microsoft Store retail locations throughout the US, seven in Canada, one in Sydney, Australia and one in London, England, which were converted to Experience Centers. Recently  Microsoft has opened Microsoft Company Stores in in Redmond and at its Silicon Valley Campus that are open to the public.

Other formats

Microsoft Specialty Stores 
In May 2013, Microsoft began to launch mall kiosk locations known as Microsoft Specialty Stores, expanding upon the Surface-focused pop-up stores established during the launch of Windows 8. They featured a smaller product offering, with a particular focus on the Surface and Windows Phone product lines.

In June 2019, Microsoft closed all Specialty Store locations.

Best Buy Windows Stores 
On June 13, 2013, Microsoft announced a partnership with the Best Buy chain to replace their Best Buy's PC departments with The Windows Store (unrelated to the Windows Store software distribution platform) at 600 locations in the United States and Canada, by September 2013. The store-within-a-store showcases Windows devices, Microsoft hardware and software products (including the Office, Surface, and Xbox lines). Departments for other manufacturers (such as Apple, Google, and Samsung) remain separate from the Windows Store sections. Best Buy also pledged to add 1,200 Microsoft-trained sales associates to its stores and to stock more accessories for Microsoft-related products, such as Windows Phone devices.

See also 
 Apple Store
 Google Store

References

External links

Microsoft Store Locations (Defunct)

Best Buy
Microsoft divisions
American companies established in 2009
American companies disestablished in 2020
Retail companies established in 2009
Retail companies disestablished in 2020
Consumer electronics retailers in the United States